Sergio Frascoli (born March 14, 1936 in San Giorgio su Legnano) is a retired Italian professional football player.

He played 6 seasons (113 games, 4 goals) in the Serie A for Aurora Pro Patria 1919, S.S.C. Venezia, A.S. Roma and SPAL 1907.

External links
 Career summary by playerhistory.com 

1936 births
Living people
People from San Giorgio su Legnano
Italian footballers
Serie A players
Aurora Pro Patria 1919 players
A.C. Monza players
Venezia F.C. players
A.S. Roma players
S.P.A.L. players
Delfino Pescara 1936 players
Association football midfielders
Footballers from Lombardy
Sportspeople from the Metropolitan City of Milan